The gerbil leaf-eared mouse (Phyllotis gerbillus) is a species of rodent in the family Cricetidae.
It is found only in Peru.

It has been discovered that P. amicus and P. gerbillius are closely related as sister species. However, P. gerbilllius belongs to the clade Phyllotis, which contains amicus, andium, and gerbellius while wolffsohni belongs to Tapecomys.  Measurements of 35 P. gerbillus adults were as follows; total length of 83.2 ± 0.72 (77-96 in ); tail 78.1 ± 1.13 (62-90 in); greatest length of skull, 23.44 ± 0.09 (22.2 - 24.5 in); zygomatic breadth, 12.32 ± 0.04 (11.7 -13.0 in) and weight, 17.37 ± 0.50 (14-25). This data excluded pregnant females.

References

Musser, G. G. and M. D. Carleton. 2005. Superfamily Muroidea. pp. 894–1531 in Mammal Species of the World a Taxonomic and Geographic Reference. D. E. Wilson and D. M. Reeder eds. Johns Hopkins University Press, Baltimore.

Phyllotis
Mammals of Peru
Taxonomy articles created by Polbot
Taxa named by Oldfield Thomas
Mammals described in 1900